The Four Saints of Nine Dragon Island are characters featured within the famed classic Chinese novel Investiture of the Gods. These four individuals Wang Mo, Yang Sen, Gao Youqian, and Li Xingba; each of them are renowned as superior men. These four superior men would later be personally recruited by Grand Old Master Wen Zhong in an attempt to put an end to the threat of King Wu.

After their deaths, Jiang Ziya deified them as the gods of the "Four Saints Grand Marshal of Lingxiao Palace" (灵霄宝殿四圣大元帅).

Wang Mo
Wang Mo is seen with a deep-blue scholarly uniform with long black hair and a pleasant complexion. Once Wang Mo arrived at the Western Foothills, he told Ziya about the three commandments and left. At a later point following his return to the Western Foothills, Wang Mo became enraged over Ziya's refusal to obey his words. Before Wang Mo could lay his sword upon Ziya, Nezha quickly jumped in the way and engaged in a duel. With Yang Sen's assistance, Wang Mo was able to once again pursue Ziya but this time within the sky. 

While riding through the clouds atop his great beast, Wang Mo unleashed his Earth Slashing Pearl technique to send Ziya tumbling down to the valley below. As Wang Mo was about to finish off Ziya, he heard Superiorman Broad Altruist singing a song. Once Wang Mo approached Broad Altruist, Broad Altruist ordered Wang Mo not to kill Ziya (for he would never be able to hear the end of the Investiture of the Gods Register if he were to do so). Wang Mo, believing Broad Altruist to be cocky, charged at him with his blade; which was immediately parried by Jinzha, Broad Altruist's student. Once Broad Altruist bound Wang's throat, feet, and waist with golden bands, Jinzha beheaded Wang Mo in one swift slash of his sword — effectively putting an end to Wang Mo's life.

Yang Sen
Yang Sen is seen in a monk-style white gown with a black face as dark as charcoal. Yang Sen also has bushy, blond hair and a braided, golden beard. Following Ziya's refusal to obey, Yang Sen teamed up with Wang Mo in battle against Nezha. If Wang Mo found any opening, Yang Sen stood ready to unleash his Sky Opening Pearl technique upon Nezha. With great skill, Yang Sen also sent the interfering Yellow Flying Tiger tumbling to the ground. Following the death of Wang Mo, Yang Sen personally vowed for revenge. The following morning, Yang Sen and his two remaining superior allies dueled it out against both Jinzha and Nezha. Yang Sen (who saw Gao Youqian killed instantly by Ziya's Devil Beating Whip), was now furious. Once Yang Sen charged at Ziya to avenge the death of his comrade, Jinzha immediately appeared and bound Yang Sen with his Seven-Treasure Golden Lotus. Yang Sen quickly fell dead after being pierced through the stomach by Jinzha's sword.

Gao Youqian
Gao Youqian is seen with a complexion of indigo blue, two protrusive buck teeth, bright red knotted hair, and a bright royal red robe. During the first attack upon Ziya, Gao Youqian unleashed his skills against Good Lob the Lobster. When Yang Sen was being bound to death by Good Lob, Gao Youqian immediately launched himself into the air and unleashed his Coalesce Pearl technique (a technique that instantly sent Lobster's head askew). Upon hearing of the death of Wang Mo, Gao Youqian also expressed his anguish and battled against Ziya the following morning. However, Gao Youqian was instantly struck in the head by Ziya's Devil Beating Whip, and thus died instantly.

Li Xingba
Li Xingba was supposedly to be the strongest member of the Foursome of Nine Dragon Island. In appearance, Li Xingba had long flowing black hair and beard, a face of plum redness and a long pale yellow gown. During the first attack upon the Western Foothills, Li Xingba assisted Wang Mo against Ziya. Following the second encounter against Ziya, Li Xingba, in great anger, battled it out against both Jinzha and Nezha. With demonic fervor following the death of all three of his allies, Li Xingba now stood as a lone warrior that possessed the determination to fight to the death. Due to the sudden assistance of Zhang Cassia and Gale Woods, Li Xingba was able to retreat atop his large beast after suffering a few minor wounds. While still being pursued by Ziya, Li Xingba barely avoided death from Ziya's whip. After escaping by flying atop his beast, he arrived at a neighboring secluded hideout to plan his next move. With great inner anguish, Li Xingba spoke the words,
"How can I possibly face my other friends on the Nine Dragon Island now that the four of us have become just a little me! We each had more than a thousand years of training and study. How could we be so stupid as to get involved in such a senseless fight? I think I'd better go to see the Grand Old Master who, after all, involved us in this mess!"

Soon thereafter, Muzha, the second brother of Nezha, suddenly appeared before Li Xingba and told him of his allegiance. Li Xingba, in a fit of rage, charged at Muzha with his sword. Unfortunately, Li was soon struck down and died.

References

 Investiture of the Gods chapter 38 - 39

Literature articles that need to differentiate between fact and fiction
Investiture of the Gods characters